The Paw Paw Formation is a geological formation in Texas whose strata date back to the late Albian stage of the Early Cretaceous. Dinosaur remains are among the fossils that have been recovered from the formation.

Fossil content 

 Pawpawsaurus campbelli - "Skull."
 Texasetes pleurohalio - "Partial skeleton."
 Turrilites
 Scaphites
 Pachyamia
 Feldmannia
 Cretacoranina
 Coloborhynchus
 Uktenadactylus
 Engonoceras sp.
 Pseudohypolophus sp.
 Squalicorax sp.
 Leptostyrax macrorhiza
 Paraisurus compressus
 Cretolamna appendiculata
 Testudines indet.
 Nodosauridae indet.

See also 
 List of dinosaur-bearing rock formations

References

Bibliography 
  
 W. P. Coombs. 1995. A new nodosaurid ankylosaur (Dinosauria: Ornithischia) from the Lower Cretaceous of Texas. Journal of Vertebrate Paleontology 15(2):298-312
 L. L. Jacobs, D. A. Winkler, P. A. Murry and J. M. Maurice. 1994. A nodosaurid scuteling from the Texas shore of the Western Interior Seaway. In K. Carpenter, K. F. Hirsch, J. R. Horner (eds.), Dinosaur Eggs and Babies 337-346

Geologic formations of Texas
Cretaceous geology of Texas
Albian Stage
Cretaceous Texas
Mudstone formations
Shallow marine deposits
Paleontology in Texas